Eutrochatella tankervillii is a species of tropical land snail with an operculum, a terrestrial gastropod mollusk in the family Helicinidae.

The specific name tankervillii is in honor of Charles Bennet, 4th Earl of Tankerville.

Distribution
Jamaica.

Description 
Circulatory system: The osmotic pressure of the hemolymph of Eutrochatella tankervillii is 67 mOsm.

References

External links 

Helicinidae
Taxa named by John Edward Gray